Nanki Otokoyama ware (南紀男山焼) is a type of Japanese pottery originally from southern Kii Province, central Japan. It is also known generally as Otokoyama ware.

History 
It should not be confused with the same-named kiln in Himeji.

A large number of pieces are blue and white pottery.

References

External links 

Culture in Wakayama Prefecture
History of Wakayama Prefecture
Japanese pottery